Montour Falls Union Grammar School is a historic elementary school building located at Montour Falls in Schuyler County, New York.  It  was built in 1929, and is a two-story, "T"-shaped, Classical Revival style steel frame and brick building over a full basement.  It features a Collegiate Gothic Tudor-arched opening flanked by buttresses and a stepped parapet. The school was closed in 1965, and has been rehabilitated into apartments and a day care. In 1965, the property was subsequently taken over by the County and has been known as the Rural Urban Center, housing County offices until 2008. It has been lovingly restored to include eight residential units and professional spaces. Nevertheless, it was listed on the National Register of Historic Places in 2015.

References

School buildings on the National Register of Historic Places in New York (state)
Neoclassical architecture in New York (state)
School buildings completed in 1921
Buildings and structures in Schuyler County, New York
National Register of Historic Places in Schuyler County, New York
1921 establishments in New York (state)